Internal Security Department may refer to:
 Internal Security Department (Brunei)
 Internal Security Department (Singapore)